Greenway is an unincorporated community in Nelson County in the U.S. state of Virginia located  west of the state capital, Richmond.

References

Unincorporated communities in Nelson County, Virginia
Unincorporated communities in Virginia